Maintenance may refer to:

Biological science 
 Maintenance of an organism
 Maintenance respiration

Non-technical maintenance 
 Alimony, also called maintenance in British English
 Champerty and maintenance, two related legal doctrines
 Child support, also commonly called "child maintenance"
 Feudal maintenance, system of funding armies

Technical maintenance 
 Maintenance (technical)
 Aircraft maintenance
 Bicycle maintenance
 Bus maintenance
 Car maintenance
 Train maintenance
 Property maintenance
 Railroad track maintenance
 Software maintenance

Some kinds of technical maintenance 
 Condition-based maintenance
 Corrective maintenance
 Planned maintenance
 Predictive maintenance
 Preventive maintenance
 Total productive maintenance